Cultural radicalism (Danish: Kulturradikalisme) was a movement in first Danish, but later also Nordic culture in general. It was particularly strong in the Interwar Period, but its philosophy has its origin in the 1870s and a great deal of modern social commentary still refer to it.

At the time of the height of the cultural radical movement it was referred to as modern. The words cultural radical and cultural radicalism was first used in an essay by Elias Bredsdorff in the broadsheet newspaper, Politiken, in 1956. Bredsdorff described cultural radicals as people who are socially responsible with an international outlook.

Cultural radicalism has usually been described as the heritage of Georg Brandes's Modern Breakthrough, the foundation and early editorials of the newspaper Politiken, the foundation of the political party Radikale Venstre, to the magazine Kritisk Revy by Poul Henningsen (PH).

The values most commonly associated with cultural radicalism are among others: criticism of religion, opposition to social norms, criticism of Victorian sexual morality, anti-militarism and an openness to new cultural input other than the classic western (e.g. jazz, modern architecture, art, literature and theater).

Internationally
Cultural radicalism is also used outside of Denmark. In Scandinavia, it often refers to the Danish movement, but elsewhere, the concept may just share the etymology. In Sweden, cultural radicalism has been seen as opposition to the Swedish church and to the Neo-Victorian sexual moral. In Norway the movement has been associated with the magazine Mot Dag in 1930s and its authors such as Sigurd Hoel and Arnulf Øverland. In the US, cultural radicalism is sometimes used as the opposite of cultural conservatism, especially in the context of culture wars.

Cultural radicals
 Kjeld Abell
 Edvard Brandes
 Georg Brandes
 Bernhard Christensen
 Mogens Fog
 Poul Henningsen
 Edvard Heiberg
 Viggo Hørup
 Hans Kirk
 Klaus Rifbjerg
 Ove Rode
 Hans Scherfig
 Tøger Seidenfaden
 August Strindberg

See also
 Modern Breakthrough
 Politiken
 Radikale Venstre
 Russian nihilist movement

External links 
 Cultural Radicalism in the Danish Democracy Canon
 Denmark/Historical perspective: cultural policies and instruments
 Kulturradikalismen on leksikon.org (in Danish)
 Kulturradikal/kulturradikalisme (in Danish)

Culture
Intellectual history
Modernism
Philosophy of culture
Political philosophy
Radicalism (historical)